Little Eve Edgarton is a 1916 American silent comedy film directed by Robert Z. Leonard and starring Ella Hall, Doris Pawn and Gretchen Lederer.

Cast
 Ella Hall as Eve Edgarton
 Doris Pawn as Miss Van Eaton
 Gretchen Lederer as Cousin Elsa
 Herbert Rawlinson as James Barton
 Thomas Jefferson as Paul R. Edgarton
 Mark Fenton as John Elbertson

References

Bibliography
 Paul C. Spehr & Gunnar Lundquist. American Film Personnel and Company Credits, 1908-1920. McFarland, 1996.

External links
 

1916 films
1916 comedy films
1910s English-language films
American silent feature films
Silent American comedy films
American black-and-white films
Films directed by Robert Z. Leonard
Universal Pictures films
1910s American films